Bedford is a city in Shawswick Township and the county seat of Lawrence County, Indiana, United States.  In the 2020 census, the population was 13,792.  That is up from 13,413 in 2010. Bedford is the principal city of the Bedford, IN Micropolitan Statistical Area, which comprises all of Lawrence County.

Early history
Bedford was laid out as a town and the county seat of Lawrence County, Indiana, United States around 1825. The original county seat was in Palestine, four miles to the south, but was moved, at the urging of the legislature, to a new location as the original location near the White River was deemed unhealthy because of malaria spread by mosquitoes. The new site was named Bedford at the suggestion of a prominent local businessman, Joseph Rawlins, who had relocated to the area from Bedford County, Tennessee. It incorporated as a town in 1864 and received its city charter in 1889. Bedford was a stop on the Underground Railroad.

Geography
The city is known as the "Limestone Capital of the World" because of its large limestone quarries that are around the area. Some of the limestone was used to make the Empire State Building and The Pentagon. Bedford is situated about 70 miles south of Indianapolis and 18 miles south of Bloomington.

Climate
The climate in this area is characterized by hot, humid summers and generally cool to cold winters.  According to the Köppen Climate Classification system, Bedford has a humid subtropical climate, abbreviated "Cfa" on climate maps. On May 25, 2011, an EF3 tornado touched down near Bedford, closing U.S. Route 50 temporarily.

Demographics

2010 census
As of the 2010 census, there were 13,413 people, 5,801 households, and 3,426 families living in the city. The racial makeup of the city was 96.2% White, 0.8% African American, 0.3% Native American, 0.9% Asian, 0.5% from other races, and 1.3% from two or more races. Hispanic or Latino of any race were 1.8% of the population.

There were 5,801 households, of which 27.7% had children under the age of 18 living with them, 41.5% were married couples living together, 13.3% had a female householder with no husband present, 4.3% had a male householder with no wife present, and 40.9% were non-families. 36.3% of all households were made up of individuals, and 16.8% had someone living alone who was 65 years of age or older. The average household size was 2.22 and the average family size was 2.87.

The median age in the city was 41.5 years. 22.3% of residents were under the age of 18; 8.1% were between the ages of 18 and 24; 23.5% were from 25 to 44; 26.2% were from 45 to 64; and 20.1% were 65 years of age or older. The gender makeup of the city was 47.3% male and 52.7% female.

2000 census
As of the 2000 census, there were 13,768 people, 6,054 households, and 3,644 families living in the city. The racial makeup of the city was 98.87% White, 0.79% African American, 0.28% Native American, 0.48% Asian, 0.01% Pacific Islander, 0.70% from other races, and 0.88% from two or more races. Hispanic or Latino of any race were 1.26% of the population.

There were 6,054 households, out of which 25.0% had children under the age of 18 living with them, 46.5% were married couples living together, 10.3% had a female householder with no husband present, and 39.8% were non-families. 35.5% of all households were made up of individuals, and 18.3% had someone living alone who was 65 years of age or older. The average household size was 2.18 and the average family size was 2.81.

In the city, the population was spread out, with 21.2% under the age of 18, 8.0% from 18 to 24, 25.7% from 25 to 44, 23.2% from 45 to 64, and 21.9% who were 65 years of age or older.  The median age was 41 years.  For every 100 females, there were 86.9 males.  For every 100 females age 18 and over, there were 81.8 males.

The median income for a household in the city was $31,022, and the median income for a family was $39,462.  Males had a median income of $31,956 versus $22,578 for females.  The per capita income for the city was $17,649.  About 7.4% of families and 11.5% of the population were below the poverty line, including 12.8% of those under age 18 and 8.6% of those age 65 or over.

Government
Bedford is governed by a mayor and city council. The city council is known as the Common Council, which consists of seven members. Five of the members are elected from individual districts while two are elected at-large. The mayor and clerk-treasurer are elected in a citywide vote.

Sports teams and history
 Bedford Stonecutters (Bedford High School) 1890-1974
 Bedford North Lawrence Stars (High School) 1975–present

The Bedford North Lawrence High School is known for its basketball and golf programs. The boys' basketball team, captained by Damon Bailey, won a state title in 1990, Also Indiana All Star Cole Sinclair 2001, is the only other Indiana All Star from Bedford . The girls won state titles in 1983, 1991, 2013, and 2014. The boys' golf ranks third in Indiana in sectional championships with 20, and second in regionals with 7, having produced dozens of college players including PGA Tour Pro Craig Bowden. They have appeared in state finals many times and have numerous top five finishes. The BNL Boys Golf team holds the IHSAA record in all sports for most Finals trips without a championship with 27.

Limestone

Bedford is known as the limestone capital of the world, and is surrounded by limestone quarries.

A common name for the light gray Indiana limestone quarried in south central Indiana is "Bedford limestone", or "Bedford Oolitic limestone".

Much of the limestone used in the construction of various Washington, D.C., monuments was quarried in the Bedford area.

Limestone from a nearby quarry, called the "Empire Quarry", was used to build the Empire State Building in New York City.

Bedford area limestone was also used in the construction of the Saint Sava Serbian Orthodox Church located in Merrillville, Indiana.

Bedford received $500,000 in grants from the federal government to build a ten-story replica of the Great Pyramid of Giza out of local limestone; however, the work was never completed, despite a further $125,000 being allocated to finish it. An 800-foot limestone replica of the Great Wall of China was also built. Construction took place in 1981 and cost $200,000. Construction on the main pyramid ceased in 1982.

Transportation
 No Interstate highways are nearby; the closest is Interstate 69, approximately 20 miles (35 km) west.
 U.S. Highway 50 goes through the heart of the city, connecting Bedford with Seymour to the east, and Vincennes to the west. Travel through Southern Indiana is often somewhat inconvenient, however, due to the hilly nature of the area.
 State Road 37 connects Bedford to Bloomington to the north and Mitchell to the south.
Bedford was served by: Indiana Rail Road, via the former Monon Railroad line to Louisville, Kentucky, and on the Canadian Pacific Railway's former Milwaukee Road line to Terre Haute, Indiana with connections to Chicago. (The Canadian Pacific line was sold to the Indiana Rail Road, on July 1, 2006.)

Education
The Bedford area has six elementary schools: Parkview Primary, Parkview Intermediate, Needmore Elementary, Lincoln Elementary, Dollens Elementary, and Shawswick Elementary. There are two middle schools that feed into Bedford North Lawrence High School: Bedford Middle School (BMS) and Oolitic Middle School (OMS). The two private schools in the city are St. Vincent Catholic School and Stone City Christian Academy. Lawrence County Independent School was founded in 2021.

The town has a lending library, the Bedford Public Library.

Statistics
According to research there were 26 registered sex offenders living in Bedford, Indiana in July 2011
The ratio of number of residents in Bedford to the number of sex offenders is 516 to 1. Bedford has a low murder rate with only 6 murders between 1999 and 2010. Bedford has a slightly higher rate of rape with 37 rapes occurring between 1999 and 2010. As a whole, by comparison to the national average of crime rate, Bedford is significantly lower than average.

Profiles of Bedford
Bedford, Indiana was featured as the subject of an hour-long PBS special entitled Our Town: Bedford, first aired in May 2006. It was produced by PBS affiliate WTIU in Bloomington, Indiana.

Bedford was recognized by the State of Indiana in 2013 by being named a Stellar Community. The Stellar Communities program is under the direction of Lieutenant Governor Sue Ellspermann and is a multi-agency partnership among the Indiana Housing and Community Development Authority, the Indiana Office of Community and Rural Affairs, the Indiana Department of Transportation and the State Revolving Fund. Only two Indiana communities are designated as such each year; Richmond was the other 2013 winner. The award brings $19 million in state, local and private funds to Bedford for planned improvements.

Bedford was also named the Indiana Chamber of Commerce's 2013 Community of the Year.

Nearby points of interest
 Bluespring Caverns
 Nashville, Indiana
 Spring Mill State Park
  Avoca Park
 West Baden Springs Hotel
 The Bedford Courthouse Square Historic District, Indiana Limestone Company Building, Madden School, C.S. Norton Mansion, Otis Park and Golf Course, William A. Ragsdale House, and Zahn Historic District are listed in the National Register of Historic Places.

Notable people

 Claude Akins, actor 
 Marie Louise Andrews, writer and journalist  
 Damon Bailey, basketball player
 Craig Bowden, PGA Tour golfer
 Kenneth Bowersox, astronaut
 Thomas J. Box, Congressional Medal of Honor recipient
 Donald Brashear, NHL player
 James Samuel Coleman, sociologist
 Bessie De Voie, vaudeville performer, dancer
 Claude Ferguson, Environmentalist 
 Carl Graf, artist
 A. B. Guthrie Jr, Pulitzer Prize-winning writer
 Aishah Hasnie - Fox News reporter
 William Jenner, U.S. senator
 Becky Muncy, musician, elementary school teacher
 Becky Skillman, Indiana lieutenant governor 
 Charles Walker, astronaut
 Fred Wampler, PGA Tour golfer
 Bob Wicker, MLB pitcher
 William T. Wiley, artist

References

External links

 City of Bedford official website
 "Our Town: Bedford" at WTIU website
 Bedford Online, community website
 The Times-Mail
 "A Glimpse of the Celebrated Stone Quarries at Bedford, Indiana", booklet by the Bedford Stone Quarries Co., Inc., circa late 1800s, on Stone Quarries and Beyond
 The unfinished pyramid is located at 

 
Cities in Indiana
Cities in Lawrence County, Indiana
Micropolitan areas of Indiana
County seats in Indiana
Populated places established in 1825
1825 establishments in Indiana